The following reports on economic indicators are reported by United States government agencies:

Business activity
Wholesale Inventories
Industrial Production (Federal Reserve) 
Capacity Utilization
Regional Manufacturing Surveys (purchasing managers' organizations and Federal Reserve banks) 
Philadelphia Fed Index (Federal Reserve Bank of Philadelphia) 
Construction Spending (U.S. Census Bureau)
Business inventory
Business Inventories (U.S. Census Bureau)
International
International trade (U.S. Census Bureau and the Bureau of Economic Analysis) 
Trade balance
Export prices
International Capital Flows (U.S. Treasury Department)
Treasury International Capital (TICs)
Sales
Auto and Truck Sales (U.S. Department of Commerce) 
Auto Sales
Truck Sales
Retail sales (U.S. Census Bureau)
Orders
Durable Goods Orders (U.S. Census Bureau)
Factory Orders (U.S. Census Bureau)
Real estate
Housing Starts and Building Permits (U.S. Census Bureau)
Building permits
Housing starts
New Home Sales (U.S. Census Bureau)
Production
GDP (Gross Domestic Product) (Bureau of Economic Analysis)
Productivity and Costs (Bureau of Labor Statistics)
Consumer
Consumer Credit (Federal Reserve) 
Employment Cost Index (U.S. Department of Labor) 
Personal Income and Consumption (Bureau of Economic Analysis) 
Personal Income
Employment
The Employment Report (Bureau of Labor Statistics) 
Hourly Earnings
Nonfarm Payrolls
Initial Claims 
 Job Openings and Labor Turnover Survey (Bureau of Labor Statistics)
 Quits Rate
Price increase ("inflation")
CPI (Consumer Price Index) (Bureau of Labor Statistics) 
PPI (Producer Price Index) (Bureau of Labor Statistics)
Government
Treasury Budget (U.S. Treasury Department)
Monetary
M2 (Federal Reserve Board)

References

Reports of the United States government
government agencies